Llanfairfechan ("Little St Mary's Parish") is a town and community in the Conwy County Borough, Wales.  It is known as a seaside resort and had a population at the 2001 Census of 3,755, reducing to 3,637 at the 2011 Census.  The history of the area dates back to at least Roman times, as demonstrated by the discovery of a large second century milestone, which is now preserved in the British Museum.

Political boundary
It was in Gwynedd from 1972 to 1996, and prior to that was in Caernarfonshire. For ceremonial and electoral boundary purposes it was transferred from the preserved county of Gwynedd to that of Clwyd in 2003.  For electoral purposes, the community of Llanfairfechan consists of three electoral wards, Bryn, Lafan and Pandy for the town council. The wards Bryn and Lafan are merged to create the Bryn ward for the county council.

Transport connections
The town lies on the north coast on the route of the A55 road, between Penmaenmawr and Bangor.  It has a railway station on the North Wales Coast Line. It, however, is in the unusual situation where there is only one public road that connects it with the remainder of the Great British road network, which is the A55 road North Wales Expressway.

Notable sites
Morfa Madryn, the salt marsh area immediately west of the town on the shore of Traeth Lafan, is a local authority-managed nature reserve of outstanding beauty and a favourite haunt of bird watchers. The site is home to cormorants and shags. The rare little egret can also be spotted. It is also not far from Aber Falls.

Llanfairfechan is also home to Bryn y Neuadd Hospital, a learning disability facility, a mental health unit (Carreg Fawr) and a medium-secure unit (Tŷ Llywelyn). The site, Bryn Y Neuadd, is also home to the control centres for both the Emergency and Non-Emergency Ambulance services for the north.

Llanfairfechan was judged North Wales Calor Village of the Year for 2009 in the competition run by Calor Gas UK

The earlier Llanfairfechan Golf Club was founded in 1909. This club continued until the early 1950s. There is still a golf club operating in the town under the same name.

Wern Isaf (Rosebriars) is a house and garden designed by the architect Herbert Luck North. Born in Llanfairfechan, Luck North studied in London under Henry Wilson and Edwin Lutyens, before returning to build a substantial practice in Wales. His home is a Grade II listed building and its garden is listed, also at Grade II on the Cadw/ICOMOS Register of Parks and Gardens of Special Historic Interest in Wales.

Welsh language 
According to the 2011 Census, 45.3% of the population of the town can speak Welsh. 66.2% of the town's population who were born in Wales noted that they could speak the language.

The two schools situated in Llanfairfechan, Ysgol Pant-y-Rhedyn and Ysgol Babanod Llanfairfechan, are categorized as being predominantly English-medium schools but with significant use of Welsh.

Town twinning 
In 2011, the process of town-twinning between Llanfairfechan and Pleumeleuc was completed over the first weekend of June. A number of events were held over the weekend, including trips to local attractions and guided tours around Llanfairfechan itself. In April 2012, 25 Llanfairfechan teenagers visited Pleumeleuc.

Climate

Gallery

References

External links

 https://catholicchurchllanfairfechan.webs.com/ 
 https://www.parishcommunity.org/
 http://www.llandudno-catholic-church.org.uk/
 A Vision of Britain Through Time
 British Listed Buildings
 Genuki
 Geograph
 Llanfairfechan Town Council website
 Llanfairfechan's Community Web Portal
 Office for National Statistics

 
Towns in Conwy County Borough
Listed buildings in Conwy County Borough
Registered historic parks and gardens in Conwy County Borough